Virtuoso Live! is a live album by jazz guitarist Joe Pass that was released in 1991. It was reissued in 1995 by Original Jazz Classics.

Reception

Writing for Allmusic, music critic Scott Yanow  wrote of the album "Through it all, Pass shows that he is one of the few guitarists who never needed other instrumentalists in order to form a complete group sound. Recommended."

Track listing
 "Stompin' at the Savoy" (Edgar Sampson, Chick Webb, Benny Goodman, Andy Razaf) – 4:53
 "Just the Way You Are" (Billy Joel) – 3:10
 "Eric's Smoozie Blues" (Pass) – 5:10
 "Beautiful Love" (Haven Gillespie, Wayne King, Egbert Van Alstyne, Victor Young) – 4:13
 "Daquilo Que Eu Sei" (Ivan Lins, Vitor Martins) – 4:29
 "In the Wee Small Hours of the Morning" (David Mann, Bob Hilliard) – 4:34
 "Love for Sale" (Cole Porter) – 5:34
 "Mack the Knife" (Bertolt Brecht, Kurt Weill, Marc Blitzstein) – 6:13
 "So What's New?" (Peggy Lee, John Pisano) – 8:48
 "(Back Home Again In) Indiana" (James Hanley, Ballard MacDonald) – 4:41

Personnel
Joe Pass – guitar

References

Joe Pass live albums
1991 live albums
Pablo Records live albums